Bellevue Healthcare Trust is a large British investment trust dedicated to investments in listed or quoted healthcare companies on a worldwide basis. It is listed on the London Stock Exchange and is a constituent of the FTSE 250 Index.

History
The company was launched on the basis of a prospectus issued on 10 November 2016.

The company changed its name from BB Healthcare Trust to Bellevue Healthcare Trust, to establish consistency with the name of its investment manager, on 3 March 2022.

Investment activity
The company is managed by Paul Major and Brett Darke of Bellevue Asset Management (UK) Limited and the chairman is Randeep Grewal.

The company's largest investments as at 31 November 2021 were as follows:

References

External links
 Official site

Investment trusts of the United Kingdom
Financial services companies established in 2016